Cosley Lake is located in Glacier National Park, in the U. S. state of Montana.

See also
 List of lakes in Glacier County, Montana

References

External links
 

Lakes of Glacier National Park (U.S.)
Lakes of Glacier County, Montana